Andrés Reyes may refer to:
Andres Reyes Jr. (born 1950), Filipino judge
Andrés Reyes (Chilean footballer) (born 1987), Chilean footballer
Andrés Reyes (footballer, born 1999), Colombian footballer

See also 
Universo 2000 (1963–2018), Mexican wrestler born Andrés Reyes González